Silk Degrees is the seventh solo album by Boz Scaggs, released on Columbia Records in February 1976. The album peaked at No. 2 and spent 115 weeks on the Billboard 200. It has been certified five times platinum by the RIAA and remains Scaggs's best selling album.

Silk Degrees spawned four singles. "It's Over" (No. 38), "Lowdown" (No. 3) and "Lido Shuffle" (No. 11) made the Top 40, while "What Can I Say" peaked at No. 42.

The front cover photograph was by Moshe Brakha of Scaggs at Casino Point, Avalon, California.

Background

The album was recorded at Davlen Sound Studios and Hollywood Sound Recorders in Los Angeles. Among the accompanying musicians, David Paich, Jeff Porcaro, and David Hungate became members of Toto, while Fred Tackett became a member of Little Feat. The album marked Scaggs's commercial zenith, a mix of pop rock ("Jump Street" and "Lido Shuffle"), soul  ("What Can I Say" and "Lowdown"), and ballads ("Harbor Lights" and "We're All Alone", which became a hit for Rita Coolidge). Scaggs wrote "Jump Street" 10 minutes before recording it, only having a rough idea of the lyrics. He stated he'd scream out words that "worked phonetically".

Release and reception

"Lowdown" reached the top 5 on the club play, black, disco, and pop charts and also did respectably on the AC chart, with its peak at number 3 on the pop chart. The song is an airplay staple to this day, particularly on AC, oldies, and smooth jazz radio stations. "It's Over", "What Can I Say", and "Lido Shuffle" reached numbers 38, 42 and 11, respectively, on the pop chart. At the Grammy Awards of 1977, "Lowdown" won the Grammy for Best R&B Song. Scaggs also received nominations for Album of the Year, Best LP Package, Best Pop Vocal by a Male, and Best R&B Vocal Performance by a Male for "Lowdown" and Joe Wissert received a nomination for Producer of the Year.

Reviewing for The Village Voice in 1976, Robert Christgau praised the album as "white soul with a sense of humor that isn't consumed in self-parody." Alex Henderson of music database website AllMusic wrote that Scaggs "hit the R&B charts in a big way with the addictive, sly 'Lowdown' [...] and expressed his love of smooth soul music almost as well on the appealing 'What Can I Say'", nonetheless noting that "Scaggs was essentially a pop/rocker, and in that area he has a considerable amount of fun". Henderson found that while the more adult contemporary-leaning ballads are less remarkable, they "have more heart than most of the bland material dominating that format."

On February 27, 2007, Silk Degrees was reissued by Legacy Records with three bonus tracks recorded live at the Greek Theatre on August 15, 1976.

Track listing
Side one

Side two

2007 bonus tracks

Personnel 

 Boz Scaggs – guitar, lead vocals, backing vocals (4, 7, 8)
 Fred Tackett – guitar
 Les Dudek – slide guitar (3)
 Louis Shelton – guitar, slide guitar (8), acoustic guitar (10)
 David Paich – arrangements, acoustic piano (1-4, 7-10), Hohner clavinet (2), Fender Rhodes (5-8), Moog synthesizer (5, 6, 9), ARP synthesizer (6), Minimoog (6, 8, 9), Hammond organ (6, 9), Wurlitzer electric piano (7, 8), harpsichord (7)
 David Hungate – bass
 Jeff Porcaro – drums, percussion (4), timbales (8)
 Joe Porcaro – percussion (1, 3)
 Plas Johnson – tenor saxophone solo (1), saxophone (8)
 Jim Horn – tenor saxophone (4)
 Bud Shank – saxophone (8)
 Chuck Findley – flugelhorn solo (5)
 Sid Sharp – string conductor and concertmaster
 Horns – Vincent DeRosa, Jim Horn, Paul Hubinon, Dick Hyde, Plas Johnson, Tom Scott and Bud Shank
 Backing vocals – Jim Gilstrap (1, 6), Maxine Green (4, 7, 8), Augie Johnson (1, 6), Marty McCall (1, 6), Pepper Swenson (4), Carolyn Willis (1, 6)

Production personnel
 Joe Wissert – production
 Tom Perry – engineering
 Doug Sax – mastering at The Mastering Lab (Los Angeles, CA).
 Ron Caro – design
 Nancy Donald – design
 Moshe Brakha – photography

Charts

Weekly charts

Year-end charts

Certifications

References

External links
"Silk Degrees" at discogs

1976 albums
Albums produced by Joe Wissert
Boz Scaggs albums
Columbia Records albums
Rhythm and blues albums by American artists